Mohammad Mustafa Castillo Amini, known as Mustafa Amini, (Dari: محمد مصطفی کاستیلو امینی, born 20 April 1993) is an Australian professional footballer who plays for Perth Glory and the Australian national team.

Born in Sydney, Amini played youth football with the Australian Institute of Sport before starting his professional career with Central Coast Mariners in the A-League. In 2011, Amini signed for Bundesliga club Borussia Dortmund. After playing only for their second team, he transferred in 2015 to Randers FC.

Amini has appeared numerous times for the Australian U-17, U-20 and U-23 teams. He took part in the 2011 FIFA U-20 World Cup.

Early life
Born in Sydney, Australia to an Afghan father  and a Nicaraguan mother, Amini grew up in the Western Sydney area. He attended Wentworthville Public School and Westfields Sports High School until moving to Lake Ginninderra College in the ACT while playing for the AIS, earning his Year 12 certificate in March 2010.

Amini wears a distinctive 'afro' haircut and is fluent in Dari and Spanish.

Playing career

Club career

Central Coast Mariners

Amini played for Blacktown City before being signed to an AIS scholarship. He was signed by the Central Coast Mariners on a two-year contract in the A-League. Amini made his debut for the senior team in a friendly against fellow Gosford club Central Coast Lightning which the Mariners won 7–1. Amini made his official A-League debut for the Mariners in a match against Brisbane Roar on 20 October 2010. His first goal came in a 3–1 away win against Gold Coast United on 9 February 2011.

Amini's excellent form throughout the 2010–11 A-League season attracted major interest from overseas clubs Borussia Dortmund and Bayern Munich. Subsequently it was announced that Amini was to spend two weeks on trial with Borussia Dortmund in preparation for the 2011 FIFA U-20 World Cup in July with a view of signing a long term deal with the Bundesliga club. Only days into his trial Borussia Dortmund publicly announced that the youngster had caught the eye of first team manager Jürgen Klopp stating that "he can definitely play football and is a really great talent."

Borussia Dortmund
On 4 July 2011, it was announced that he had signed with Bundesliga club Borussia Dortmund on a four-year contract. However, Amini would initially be loaned to Central Coast Mariners until 31 May 2012, making him eligible to play for the club during the 2011–12 A-League season as well as the group stage of the Asian Champions League. He played outstandingly well as Central Coast marched to the quarter-finals.

On 11 July 2012, Amini made his debut for Borussia Dortmund in a friendly against SV Meppen, scoring a goal in the 63rd minute en route a 2–1 victory for Dortmund. Amini scored his first goal for the second team in a game against MSV Duisburg on matchday 7 of the 2013–14 3. Liga season.

In March 2015, Amini announced, that he would leave the club when his contract expired in June, after playing there for three years.

Randers FC
Amini signed a three-year deal with Danish Superliga club Randers FC in June 2015. He scored the opening goal in the club's 3–0 UEFA Europa League qualifying second leg win over Sant Julià.

AGF
In June 2016, Amini moved to Superliga side AGF on a four-year deal. Amini enjoyed a good debut for AGF, with a goal and an assist in a 2–1 win away at SønderjyskE in the Superliga on 17 July 2016.

Cyprus
In June 2021, Amini joined Cypriot First Division side Apollon Limassol on a two-year deal. In September 2021, Amini was loaned out to fellow First Division club PAEEK. In December 2021, he mutually terminated his contract with Apollon Limassol and left both Cypriot clubs.

Sydney FC
On 24 December 2021, Amini signed a six-month deal with A-League Men club Sydney FC as an injury replacement for Luke Brattan.

Perth Glory
On 10 June 2022, Amini signed a three-year deal with A-League Men club Perth Glory. Amini was announced just hours after the club released a statement advising members and fans that former Glory skipper, Brandon O'Neill had his request granted for an early release from his deal.

Amini was named Perth Glory team captain on 6 October 2022 ahead of the 2022–23 A-League Men season.

International career

Youth
Amini was first selected for Australia under-17 to play Turkey in a two-match series in April 2009 in Turkey. He made his Joeys debut in the first match of the series, a 1–0 loss, starting the match as a defender, but moving into midfield in the second half before being substituted late in the game. He also played a full match in the second leg, a 2–1 defeat.

Amini was selected to play for Australia U-20 in a four-match tour of South America against the Argentina U-20 and Paraguay U-20 teams from 3–19 April. He was then selected for the Australia U-20 again for the 2010 AFF U-19 Youth Championship. Amini scored his first goal for the Australia U-20 in the 2010 AFF U-19 Youth Championship in a 4–1 win over Vietnam U-20.

Senior
On 23 March 2011, after impressing on trial at Borussia Dortmund, Amini was called up to the Australian national side training camp by Head Coach Holger Osieck which was being held in Germany.

Amini was named among the 43 players squad to represent Afghanistan for 2014 AFC Challenge Cup preparations camp in Qatar, but he refused the call saying "I only want to play for Australia if I get the chance".

Amini was called-up to Australia's senior squad ahead of the World Cup qualifiers in March 2017. He debuted on 28 March 2017 against the United Arab Emirates at Allianz Stadium in Sydney, when subbed on in the 87th minute.

20 November 2018, Amini made his first starting appearance for Australia at Stadium Australia, Sydney in a friendly match against Lebanon in front of a crowd of 33,268 people. Amini played 74 minutes before being replaced by debutant James Jeggo with Australia three goals in the lead at the time. Australia went on to win the match 3–0.

Career statistics

Club

International
Statistics accurate as of match played 15 October 2019.

Honours
Central Coast Mariners
A-League Premiership: 2011–12
Australia U19
 AFF U-19 Youth Championship: 2010

See also
List of Central Coast Mariners FC players
List of foreign Danish Superliga players

References

External links

1993 births
Living people
Australian expatriate soccer players
Australia international soccer players
Australia youth international soccer players
Australia under-20 international soccer players
A-League Men players
Australian people of Afghan descent
Australian people of Nicaraguan descent
Sportspeople of Afghan descent
Sportspeople of Nicaraguan descent
Sportsmen from New South Wales
Blacktown City FC players
Central Coast Mariners FC players
Borussia Dortmund players
Borussia Dortmund II players
Randers FC players
Aarhus Gymnastikforening players
Australian Institute of Sport soccer players
3. Liga players
Danish Superliga players
Soccer players from Sydney
Association football midfielders
People educated at Lake Ginninderra College
2019 AFC Asian Cup players
Australian expatriate sportspeople in Germany
Australian expatriate sportspeople in Denmark
Expatriate footballers in Germany
Expatriate men's footballers in Denmark
Australian soccer players